Robert Green "Bobby" Brooks (born August 19, 1957 in Minneapolis, Minnesota) is an American record producer and audio engineer.  He is given credit for his signature R&B sound as well as shaping Motown's hits.

List of albums produced

1970s
1979: Sally Moore, Sally Moore—Mixing

1980s
1982: All This Love, DeBarge—Engineer
1982: Reunion, The Temptations—Engineer
1982: You've Got the Power, Third World—Engineer
1984: Starchild, Teena Marie—Engineer, Mixing
1986: Watch Out, Patrice Rushen—Engineer
1987: Naked to the World, Teena Marie—Engineer, Mixing
1988: Say It Again, Jermaine Stewart—Engineer
1988: Pebbles, Pebbles—Engineer
1988: Shieldstone, Shieldstone—Engineer, Mixing
1988: Tracie Spencer, Tracie Spencer—Mixing, Engineer
1989:  Come Play with Me, Grady Harrell—Producer, Engineer, Mixing
1989:  Larger than Life, Jody Watley—Engineer

1990s
1990:  I'm Your Baby Tonight, Whitney Houston—Engineer, Mixing
1990:  Ivory, Teena Marie—Engineer, Mixing
1991:  Affairs of the Heart, Jody Watley—Engineer
1991:  Bandits, Carl King—Engineer
1991:  Milestone, The Temptations—Engineer, Mixing
1991:  Mo' Ritmo,  Gerardo—Engineer, Mixing
1991:  Red Hot + Blue: A Tribute to Cole Porter, Various Artists—Engineer
1991:  Romance Me, Grady Harrell—Mixing
1992:  All for Love, Timmy T—Engineer
1992:  Do I Ever Cross Your Mind?, George Howard—Engineer, Mixing
1992:  Love and Understanding, George Howard—Engineer, Mixing, Saxophone
1992:  Love Dancin, Rodney Franklin—Engineer, Mixing,
1992:  M M E Program 1, Force One Network—Engineer, Mixing
1992:  Make Us One, Jackson Family—Engineer
1992:  Something Real, Stephanie Mills—Engineer
1992:  White Men Can't Jump, Original soundtrack—Recorder, Engineer
1993:  Intimacy, Jody Watley—Engineer, Mixing
1993:  Love Zone, Mahogany Blue—Mixing
1993:  Show Me Your Heart, Andrew Logan—Mixing
1993:  When Summer Comes, George Howard—Engineer, Mixing
1994:  Born Dead, Body Count—Engineer
1994:  Continuum (Nine Winds), Continuum—Engineer, Mixing
1994:  Motown Comes Home, Various Artists—Engineer, Mixing
1994:  Sonic the Hedgehog 3, Brad Buxer, Cirocco Jones—Composer
1994:  Turn Yourself Around, A-1 Swift—Engineer, Mixing, Mixing Engineer
1995:  Attitude Adjustment, George Howard—Mixing
1995:  Forbidden, Black Sabbath—Recorder, Engineer, Mixing
1995:  HIStory: Past, Present and Future, Book I, Michael Jackson—Percussion, Drums, Programming
1995:  In the House, The 5th Dimension—Engineer, Mixing
1996:  Best of Tyrone Davis: In the Mood, Tyrone Davis—Engineer
1996:  Hillside, Hillside—Voices, Engineer
1996:  Kenny Lattimore, Kenny Lattimore—Engineer
1996:  Life (A New Musical), Original Cast—Engineer
1996:  O, Glory: The Apostolic Studio Sessions, Rev. Gary Davis—Vocals, Choir, Chorus , Engineer
1996:  Slang, Def Leppard—Programming, Production
1997:  4 Tha Hard Way, Rappin' 4-Tay—Engineer
1997:  Best New Age, Vol. 6, Various Artists—Performer
1997:  Betta Listen, Laurneá—Engineer
1997:  Blood on the Dance Floor: HIStory in the Mix, Michael Jackson—Synthesizer, Percussion, Drums, Programming, Engineer
1997:  Lovergirl: The Teena Marie Story, Teena Marie—Engineer Mixing
1997:  Momentum, Jennifer Batten—Producer, Engineer	
1997:  Money Talks [Clean], Original soundtrack—Engineer
1997:  Money Talks, Original soundtrack—Engineer
1997:  Soul Control, Gerald Veasley—Engineer
1997:  Soul Network Program II, Force One Network—Engineer, Mixing
1997:  Urban Rapsody [Clean], Rick James—Engineer, Mixing
1997:  Urban Rapsody, Rick James—Engineer, Mixing
1997:  Cellophane, Cellophane—Engineer
1997:  Violent Demise: The Last Days, Body Count—Engineer, Mixing
1998:  Dionne Sings Dionne, Dionne Warwick—Engineer
1998:  Eight Days of Ecstasy, Pamela Williams—Engineer
1998:  Explore, Various Artists—Engineer
1998:  Here We Go Again, Dazz Band—Engineer, Mastering, Mixing
1998:  Midnight Mood, George Howard—Engineer
1998:  Pass the Dutchie [EP], Buck-O-Nine—Engineer, Mixing
1998:  Waste of Mind, Zebrahead—Engineer
1999:  Deck the Halls (I Hate Christmas), Zebrahead—Engineer, Mixing
1999:  The Fundamental Elements of Southtown, P.O.D.—Engineer, Mixing
1999:  Meson Ray, The Ernies—Engineer, Mixing
1999:  Never Give In: A Tribute to Bad Brains, Various Artists—Mixing
1999:  Real Me, Zebrahead—Engineer
1999:  Tribus, Sepultura—Mixing
1999:  Universal Records Rock Sampler [1999], Various Artists—Engineer

2000s
2000:  Any Given Sunday [Clean], Original soundtrack—Engineer
2000:  Any Given Sunday, Original soundtrack—Engineer
2000:  The Fundamental Elements of Southtown [Import Bonus Track], P.O.D.—Engineer, Mixing
2000:  Holy Dogs, Stir—Engineer
2000:  Passages, Continuum—Engineer
2000:  Playmate of the Year, Zebrahead—Engineer, Loops, Production
2000:  Ready to Rumble [Clean], Original soundtrack—Engineer
2000:  Ready to Rumble, Original soundtrack—Engineer
2000:  Shame and Her Sister, Far Too Jones—Engineer
2001:  Armageddon Through Your Speakers, Bionic Jive—Engineer
2001:  Bleed the Sky [Clean], Reveille—Engineer, Editing
2001:  Bleed the Sky, Reveille—Engineer, Editing
2001:  Nullset, Nullset—Engineer
2001:  Pin the Tail on the Honkey, Dislocated Styles—Engineer
2001:  Satellite, P.O.D.—Editing, Assistant Engineer
2001:  Street Songs [Deluxe Edition], Rick James—Engineer, Mixing
2001:  Stupid Fat Americans, Zebrahead—Engineer, Mixing
2001:  Throwing the Game, Lucky Boys Confusion—Programming, Vocals (background), Engineer
2002:  Bleed the Sky [Bonus Track], Reveille—Engineer, Digital Editing
2002:  Bleed the Sky [Clean] [Bonus Track], Reveille—Engineer, Digital Editing
2002:  Life Force Radio, Afu-Ra—Engineer
2002:  Plays Duke Ellington [Bonus Tracks], Ben Webster—Engineer, Drums
2002:  Satellite [Japan Bonus Tracks], P.O.D.—Engineer, Digital Editing, Mixing
2002:  Street Songs [Bonus Tracks], Rick James—Engineer, Mixing
2002:  Undisputed, Original soundtrack—Engineer
2003:  Freddy vs. Jason [Clean], Original soundtrack—Mixing
2003:  Freddy vs. Jason, Original soundtrack-Mixing
2003:  Rebirth of the Cool, Rayford Griffin—Engineer
2003:  Story of My Life, Roez Boyz--Mixing
2004:  Michael Jackson: The Ultimate Collection, Michael Jackson--Engineer
2005:  No Boundaries, Ladysmith Black Mambazo--Executive Producer, Art Direction
2006:  Greatest Hits: The Atlantic Years, P.O.D.--Engineer
2008:  Against/Nation'', Sepultura—Mixing

References 
 Discogs - Bobby Brooks

1957 births
Living people
Record producers from Minnesota
Businesspeople from Minneapolis